Palestine participated in the 2008 Summer Paralympics in Beijing, but did not win any medals.

Athletics

See also
Palestine at the Paralympics
Palestine at the 2008 Summer Olympics

References

External links
International Paralympic Committee

Nations at the 2008 Summer Paralympics
2008
Para